Galegu Airport is an airport serving Dinder in Sudan.

Airports in Sudan